Roxboro is a city and the county seat of Person County in the U.S. state of North Carolina. The population was 8,134 at the 2020 census. The Durham–Chapel Hill MSA is a part of the larger Raleigh–Durham–Cary Combined Statistical Area, which has a population of 2,043,867 as of the 2020 Census.

History

Roxboro is named after a town in Scotland; Roxburgh. Although spelled differently, they are pronounced the same. Prior to the official adoption of the name Roxboro, the community was known as "Mocassin Gap". The city of Roxboro was incorporated on January 9, 1855, and remains the only municipality in Person County.

The Holloway-Jones-Day House, House on Wagstaff Farm, James A. and Laura Thompson Long House, Merritt-Winstead House, Person County Courthouse, Roxboro Commercial Historic District, Roxboro Cotton Mill, and Roxboro Male Academy and Methodist Parsonage are listed on the National Register of Historic Places.

On July 7, 1920, Red Roach was lynched in downtown Roxboro.

On August 15, 1941, a mob of 500 attempted to lynch Cy Winstead, a 22 year old black man, who was accused of raping a white woman and was being held at the Person county court house. The mob was held off with tear gas by local authorities led by Sheriff M. T. Clayton until Winstead could be safely transferred to the state prison in Raleigh, NC. No injuries were reported. Ten men were indicted for the attempted lynching on October 16, 1941, on misdemeanor charges for "unlawful assembly for unlawful purpose".

Geography
Roxboro is located at  (36.391690, −78.981877).

Climate
Roxboro has a moderate subtropical climate, with mild weather in the spring, fall, and winter. However, summers can be hot and humid. Winter temperatures generally range from highs in the low 50s°F (10-13 °C) to lows in the upper 20s-mid 30s°F (-2 to 2 °C), though  degree weather is not uncommon. The record low was -9 °F in January 1985. Spring and fall days are usually in the low to mid 70s°F (low 20s°C), with nights in the 50s°F (10-14 °C). Summer days are often in the upper 80s and low 90s °F (30-35 °C,) with very high humidity. The record high was 104 °F in July 1966. The rainiest months are July and September.

Freezing rain and sleet occur most winters, and occasionally the area experiences a major, damaging ice storm. Roxboro is often dubbed the "Snow Capital of the Triangle" because it often receives the most or close to the most snow during snowstorms in central North Carolina due to its high elevation.

Law and government

City Council
 Merilyn P. Newell, Mayor 
 Cynthia C. Petty, Mayor Pro-Tem  
 Tim Chandler, Councilman  
 Shaina Outlaw, Councilwoman
 Mark Phillips, Councilman
 Peter Baker, Councilman

Mayor and City Council members are elected to four-year terms on a non-partisan, at-large basis.

Public safety
In 2009, 0 murders or non-negligent manslaughters were reported on the Federal Bureau of Investigation's Uniform Crime Reports.

Businesses
Roxboro businesses include LED lighting, law firms, electrical, textile, manufacturing, aerodynamics, administrative, winery, brokering, food processing, automotive, tobacco agriculture, aluminum and paper products. Roxboro is also adjacent to North Carolina's Research Triangle region, home to numerous high-tech companies and enterprises.

Largest employers:
 Duke Energy
 Eaton Corporation
 Georgia-Pacific Corporation
 GKN Driveline
 Person County Schools
 Person Memorial Hospital
 Polywood

Other businesses:
 Boise Cascade
 CenterEdge Software
 CertainTeed
 Louisiana-Pacific Corporation

Demographics

2020 census

As of the 2020 United States census, there were 8,134 people, 3,348 households, and 1,739 families residing in the city.

2010 census
As of the census of 2010 there were 8,362 people, 3,479 households, and 1,979 families residing in the city. The racial makeup of the city was 44.9% White, 46.8% African American, 0.6% Native American, 0.4% Asian, 0.01% Pacific Islander, 2.59% from other races, and 2.1% from two or more races. Hispanic or Latino people of any race were 8.7% of the population. (This reporting does not take into account the massive annual influx of Hispanic migrant labor.)

There were 3,479 households, out of which 28.1% had children under the age of 18 living with them, 35.2% were married couples living together, 22.0% had a female householder with no husband present, and 38.8% were non-families. 33.8% of all households were made up of individuals, and 15.2% had someone living alone who was 65 years of age or older. The average household size was 2.21 and the average family size was 2.76.

In the city the population was spread out, with 23.7% under the age of 18, 8.4% from 18 to 24, 29.0% from 25 to 44, 20.8% from 45 to 64, and 18.1% who were 65 years of age or older. The median age was 44.1 years. For every 100 females there were 81.3 males. For every 100 females age 18 and over, there were 77.8 males.

The median income for a household in the city was $36,918 and the median income for a family was $42,559. Males had a median income of $27,741 versus $23,245 for females. The per capita income for the city was $17,824. About 13.4% of families and 16.8% of the population were below the poverty line, including 21.6% of those under age 18 and 14.5% of those age 65 or over.

Education
See Person County, North Carolina.
Piedmont Community College

Culture

Museum
 Person County Museum of History – The museum complex includes the Kitchen House, the Male Academy/Parsonage, Woodsdale General Store, Dr. John H. Merritt's office, a tobacco barn, and the Van Hook Subscription School, which is believed to be the oldest in the state. An exhibit features athletic exploits of Roxboro's own Enos Slaughter to Person County's connection with the RMS Titanic in uptown Roxboro.

Entertainment
 Roxboro Motorsports Dragway – An IHRA sanctioned, 1/8 mile concrete dragstrip opened in 1960. Car, truck and bike events are the norm during the spring, summer and fall.
 Rock Sportsplex – Features five baseball fields and a batting cage.

Farmers market
 Person County Farmers Market – Locally grown produce and goods. Located in the business district.
 Roxboro Farmers Market on Depot Street – Fresh produce and other goods. Located in Uptown Roxboro.

Festivals
 Personality – A two-day festival is held in August and brings thousands to uptown. It includes street dancing, games, music, booths, food and rides.
 Lake Mayo Canoe/Kayak Festival – This one-day event is for paddlers and spectators alike. It is celebrated each spring on Lake Mayo.
 Willow Oak Blue Grass Festival – Held in June and September of each year, this park setting is the home of national, regional, and local blue grass bands. The site includes camping, food, and concessions.
 Curam Fest – Indulge in the delicious knowledge of Curam Development. Curam Experts from all over the world gather here to discuss the framework.
 Flem Whitt Beach Music Festival – Usually held the first weekend in August at the Hyco Lake recreation area and includes music from multiple well known beach music bands.

Events
 Clash of the Carts – The competition invites teams of amateur engineers, mechanics, performing artists, general goofballs, and others to create outrageous human powered soapbox carts to race against the clock in a two block downhill sprint to the finish line in uptown.
 Mayo Lake Cyclysm – Join over 100 cyclists on a scenic journey through rural North Carolina and Virginia. Cyclysm Bicycle Tour is usually held the third weekend of October.
 Friday Night Football – Rocket football is big in this town, a good way to end the work week with a little fun. Rocket football brings out thousands of family/friends from the community to watch the game. Also home of Douglas Weaver, Lebrayan Street, Brandon Smith, Jacob Newton, Dan Lawrence and other outstanding former Rocket football players
 Relay For Life – Cancer fight fund-raising event from all walks of life, including patients, medical support staff, local businesses, friends, families, corporations, civic organizations, churches and community volunteers. This yearly event is held at Person High School Stadium in late September or early October.
 Flat River Antique Engine and Tractor Show – This two-day event attracts many exhibitors and visitors with demonstrations and displays based on the rich agricultural heritage of Person County. Event held in mid September at Optimist Park.
 July 4 parade and fireworks – Main Street is paraded with antique cars, hot rods, tractors and horse back riders. Followed by celebration of American spirit and pride. Set at the Person High School Stadium, the colorful sights and sounds are preceded by a live concert.
 Alive After 5 – Hundreds of musical fans gather to listen to the smooth sounds of local bands. This summer event usually held twice a year in June and July at Merritt Commons in uptown.

Performing arts
 Kirby Civic Auditorium – Entertainment in this restored historic movie theater in uptown Roxboro features live theater, dance, and concerts. Headliners have included Branford Marsalis, Doc Watson, the Embers, Mike Cross, and year-round local productions. Total seating capacity – 1028.
 Roxboro Little Theater – Producing stage entertainment for over 30 years, through the efforts of both local and regional thespians. RLT has featured such productions as The Wizard of Oz, Steel Magnolias, The Sound of Music,  Oliver, and Fiddler on the Roof.
 Merritt Commons Pavilion – Hosts local music acts and stage plays in uptown Roxboro.

Public library

 Person County Public Library is located in Roxboro. The library hosts over fifty programs a year for children, and an average of two programs a month for adults. There are over 26,000 library card holders.

Parks and recreation
 Allensville Park
 Bushy Fork Park
 Huck Sansbury Recreation Complex
 Hurdle Mills Park
 Longhurst Park
 Mayo Park
 Mt. Tirzah Park
 Olive Hill Park
 Optimist Park

Other attractions include:
 Hyco Lake
 Mayo Lake
 Piedmont Community College Nature Trail – A system of seven trails with an observatory.
 Rock Sportsplex – five baseball fields and a batting cage
 Roxboro City Lake
 Roxboro Country Club – 18-hole golf course

Shopping
 Hall's Way
 Madison Corners
 Madison Square
 Person Plaza
 Piedmont Square
 Roxboro Commons
 Roxboro Market Place
 Roxboro Square

Infrastructure

Transportation

Air 

Railroad 
 Norfolk Southern has freight rail lines.
 Roxboro is not served directly by passenger trains. Amtrak serves nearby Durham.

Major highways 
 United States Highways:
  U.S. Route 158
  U.S. Route 501 
 North Carolina Highways:
  N.C. 49
  N.C. 57
  N.C. 157

Public transit 
 Person Area Transit System (PATS) operates local bus routes within Roxboro.

Utilities
The city's electric system is maintained by Duke Energy and Piedmont Electric Membership Cooperative. Telephone networks include CenturyLink, wireless networks - AT&T Mobility, U.S. Cellular and Verizon Wireless. Broadband internet is provided by CenturyLink, Electronic Solutions and Charter Communications. Cable television service is available from Charter Communications and CenturyLink.

Media

Print media
Newspapers and periodicals that serve the Roxboro and surrounding area include:

 The Courier-Times
 The Herald-Sun

Radio
Roxboro is the city of license for two radio stations:
 
 96.7 FM WKRX Country ("Kickin Country")
 1430 AM WRXO Country ("Oldies 1430")

Other nearby stations
 W281AE 104.1 FM (.01 kW translator of Liberty University's WRVL, Lynchburg, Virginia)

Television
Roxboro is part of the Raleigh-Durham-Fayetteville Designated Market Area, the 24th largest broadcast television market in the United States.

 WFMY-TV from Greensboro, NC is carried on DirecTV.
 WSET-TV from Lynchburg, Virginia is carried on DirecTV. Up until 2020 WSET-TV was carried on Charter Spectrum cable.

Notable people
 Jamie Barnette, former Canadian Football League quarterback
 Betty Lou Beets, convicted murderer who was sentenced to death for murdering her husband
 Robert L. Blackwell, soldier in World War I and Medal of Honor recipient
 Margie Bowes, country music singer
 Mary Jayne Harrelson, middle-distance runner; won two NCAA national championships in the 1500 meters at Appalachian State University
 Frank Kimbrough, post-bop Jazz pianist 
 Carl Long, NASCAR driver
 Tom Long, CEO of MillerCoors Brewing Company
 Wendy Palmer, former WNBA player and current head women's basketball coach at UNCG
 James Ramsey, politician and lawyer
 Enos Slaughter, aka "Country", former Major League Baseball player and member of the National Baseball Hall of Fame
 Henry Slaughter, Southern gospel musician (cousin of Enos Slaughter)
 Jim Thorpe, Champions Tour professional golfer
 Luke Torian, politician, Virginia House of Delegates 52nd District Representative
 George Yarborough, soldier in World War I; recipient of both the Navy Cross and Distinguished Service Cross

See also
 Research Triangle Metropolitan Region ("The Triangle")
 Virginia International Raceway, a nearby multi-purpose road course offering auto and motorcycle racing
 Orange County Speedway, a nearby former NASCAR Busch Grand National Series track

References

External links
 City of Roxboro
 The Courier-Times
 Roxboro Area Chamber of Commerce

Cities in Person County, North Carolina
County seats in North Carolina
Populated places established in 1855
Cities in North Carolina
1855 establishments in North Carolina